Béla of Macsó (after 1243 – November 1272) was a member of the Rurik dynasty. He was Duke of Macsó (1262–1272) and of Bosnia (1266/1271-1272); and thus he governed the southern provinces of the Kingdom of Hungary.

Béla was the son of Duke Rostislav of Macsó and his wife, Anna, a daughter of King Béla IV of Hungary. When Duke Rostislav died in 1262, his lands were divided between his sons: Béla inherited the Banate of Macsó (including Belgrade and the Braničevo province), and his brother, Michael inherited their father’s part of Bosnia. King Béla IV, having made these assignments to his grandsons, decided also to make some further changes in his peripheral territories, and assigned Slavonia, Dalmatia, and Croatia, which until then had all been under his elder son and heir, Stephen V, to a younger son named Béla.

Stephen V was infuriated and immediately revolted against his father; during the ensuing war, Béla and his mother assisted Béla IV. His grandfather and uncle (Béla IV and Stephen V) concluded a peace on 5 December 1262, and according to the peace the kingdom was divided, the latter acquiring the territories east of the river Danube as “junior king”. After the peace, Stephen V occupied the possessions which Béla and his brother had inherited from their father in the eastern parts of the kingdom (the former royal possessions in Bereg County and the Castle of Füzér). Their mother submitted a formal complaint against her brother to Pope Urban IV, but the "junior king" did not hand back their possessions.

In December 1264, the troops of Béla IV invaded the parts of the kingdom which had been ruled by the “junior king”. The “senior king” appointed the young Béla (his grandson) to lead one of his troops, but the actual leader of the royal army was Henry Kőszegi. In the Battle of Isaszeg, Stephen V defeated his father’s troops, and Béla fled from the battle-field.

The two kings (Béla’s grandfather and uncle) concluded a new peace on March 23, 1266 on the Margaret Island and affirmed the former division of the Kingdom of Hungary between them. By that time Béla’s brother, Michael had died, and thus Béla inherited the parts of Bosnia his brother had been ruling before his death. In 1268, King Stefan Uroš I of Serbia led his troops to plunder Macsó, and the Serbs did considerable damage before Hungarian help came. The Hungarian troops sent by Béla’s grandfather then managed to capture Stefan Uroš himself, and the Serbian king was forced to purchase his release.

When his grandfather died on May 3, 1270, Béla did not follow the example of his mother and his grandfather’s other partisans (among them Henry Kőszegi), who escaped to the court of her son-in-law, King Otakar II of Bohemia. And indeed, Béla assisted his uncle, King Stephen V against the Czech king and his followers.

After King Stephen V had died on August 6, 1272, and his son, the young Ladislaus IV ascended the throne, King Béla IV’s former partisans (among them Béla’s mother and Henry Kőszegi) returned to Hungary. Thenceforward, several fractions of the leading nobles were competing with each other, and all of them were endeavoring to acquire the control over the government of the kingdom. In November, the members of Henry Kőszegi’s retinue killed Béla (who was the young king’s closest adult male relative at that time) following a sharp dispute.

After his murder, Béla’s domains were divided among the members of the leading noble families.

Ancestors

Footnotes

Sources

 
 
 
 
 
 
 
 
 

 
Kristó, Gyula: Középkori históriák oklevelekben (1002-1410) (Medieval Stories in Royal Charters /1002-1410/); Szegedi Középkorász Műhely in association with the Gondolat Kiadó, 1992, Szeged; .

 
 
 
 
 

Dukes of Macsó
13th-century rulers in Europe
1272 deaths
Olgovichi family
13th-century Hungarian people
Year of birth uncertain
Dukes of Bosnia
Assassinated Hungarian people